The Women's 3000 metres race of the 2015 World Single Distance Speed Skating Championships was held on 12 February 2015.

Results
The race was started at 18:00.

References

Women's 3000 metres
World